Canace salonitana, is a European species of Canacidae.

Distribution
It is known from Bulgaria, Croatia, Egypt, Crete, Israel and Italy.

References

Canacidae
Muscomorph flies of Europe
Diptera of Africa
Insects described in 1900
Taxa named by Gabriel Strobl